Jorge Andrés Ocejo Moreno (born 30 March 1943) is a Mexican politician affiliated with the PAN. As of 2013 he served as Senator of the LX and LXI Legislatures of the Mexican Congress representing the Federal District. He also served as Deputy between 1994 and 1997.

References

1943 births
Living people
Politicians from Mexico City
Members of the Senate of the Republic (Mexico)
Members of the Chamber of Deputies (Mexico)
National Action Party (Mexico) politicians
20th-century Mexican politicians
21st-century Mexican politicians
National Autonomous University of Mexico alumni